The 1987 United Kingdom general election in Wales took place on 11 June 1987 for all 38 Welsh seats to the House of Commons. The Labour Party again won a majority of Welsh MPs, gaining four seats for a total of 24 out of 38. The governing Conservatives lost six seats, with the SDP-Liberal Alliance and Plaid Cymru gaining one each.

Despite Labour winning the most votes in Wales, across the UK the Conservatives won a landslide majority and continued in office for a third term.

Results
Below is a table summarising the results of the 1987 general election in Wales.

Aftermath 
More than 25,000 Welsh colliers lost their jobs in the decade of pit closures following the miners' strike of 1984. The coalfield communities in Wales still accounted for a quarter of the entire Welsh population in 2014. The closures caused the mining areas of Wales to have the lowest "job density" of all 16 coalfield communities across Wales (and lower job densities than the areas of Scotland and England also).

The coal mines of Abernant and Abercynon were closed in 1988, Cynheidre and Marine/Six Bells, Merthyr Vale, Oakdale and Trelewis were closed in 1989. Deep navigation and Penallta mines were also closed in 1991.

References

1987 in Wales
1980s elections in Wales
1987
Wales